Denis Savin is a principal dancer with the Bolshoi Ballet in Russia, and is a 2012 recipient of the Golden Mask award.

Early life and career
Savin was born Moscow. In 2002 he graduated from Moscow State Academy of Choreography where his teacher was Igor Uksusnikov. Following the graduation he worked as a solo dancer in Corps de Ballet of the Bolshoi Theater. In 2003 he appeared in his first leading role, playing as Romeo in Romeo and Juliet, a ballet which was produced by Declan Donnelan and choreographed by Radu Poklitary. Three years later he took part in Studio of New Choreography where he appeared in a play called Acquisition along with Anna Nikulina and in 2007 appeared in a ballet called Old Ladies Falling Out with the same project at the Territory Festival.

Repertoire
2002 — Giselle — Pas d’action
2002 — Raymonda — Grand Pas
2002 — Cipollino — Prince Lemon
2003 — The Bright Stream — highlander
2004 — The Sleeping Beauty — Grey Wolf
2004 — The Nutcracker — The Mouse King2004 — Ward # 6 — patient2004 — A Midnight's Summer Dream — moth2005 — A Midnight's Summer Dream — Lysander2005 — The Bolt — Denis2005 — Jeu de cards — soloist2006 — Lea — Hannan2006 — The Golden Age — sailor2007 — Legend of Love — officers2007 — Don Quixote — Gamache2007 — In the Upper Room — soloist2007 — The Bright Stream — Pyotr2008 — La Sylphide — Gurn2008 — Spartacus — shepherd2008 — La Fille du Pharaon — slave2008 — Flames of Paris — Jerome2008 — Russian Seasons — Couple in red2008 — Nutcracker — Drosselmeyer2009 — Giselle — Hilarion2009 — Coppélia — Csardas2009 — Zakharova Super Game — delta2009 — Spartacus — gladiator2009 — La Esmeralda — Gringoire2010 — Petrushka — moor2010 — Herman Schmerman — Pas de deux2010 — Chroma2011 — Giselle — Hans2012 — Anyuta — Artynov2012 — Le Corsaire — Birbanto2012 — Carmen Suite — Torero2012 — Dream of Dream — duet2012 — Moydodyr — Chimney-sweep2013 — La Bayadère — dance with a drum2013 — The Sleeping Beauty — Evil Fairy Carabosse2013 — Kvartira — Bidet2013 — Romeo and Juliet — Tybalt2013 — Marco Spada — Pepinelli2014 — Raymonda — Abderakhman2014 — The Taming of the Shrew — Petruchio2014 — Legend of Love — Vizier2015 — Hamlet — Hamlet''

References

Living people
Russian male ballet dancers
Dancers from Moscow
Recipients of the Golden Mask
Moscow State Academy of Choreography alumni
Year of birth missing (living people)
21st-century Russian ballet dancers